Mark Anthony Jackson (born July 23, 1963) is an American former professional football player who was selected by the Denver Broncos in the sixth round of the 1986 NFL Draft. Jackson attended high school at Terre Haute South Vigo High School and Alton Senior High School.

Jackson played in Super Bowls XXI, XXII, and XXIV with the Broncos. Jackson caught the touchdown pass that sent the game into overtime, completing "The Drive" in the Broncos' January 11, 1987 AFC Championship Game victory over the Cleveland Browns.

Along with Vance Johnson and Ricky Nattiel, Jackson comprised the "Three Amigos" receiving combination in the late 1980s. 's NFL off-season, Mark Jackson held the Broncos franchise record for career yards per reception in the playoffs (19.29).

References

1963 births
Living people
Sportspeople from Terre Haute, Indiana
People from the Denver metropolitan area
Players of American football from Chicago
Players of American football from Indiana
American football wide receivers
Purdue Boilermakers football players
Denver Broncos players
New York Giants players
Indianapolis Colts players